Steno-Apollo is a feature on Earth's Moon, a crater in Taurus-Littrow valley.  Astronauts Eugene Cernan and Harrison Schmitt visited it in 1972, on the Apollo 17 mission.  The astronauts referred to it simply as Steno during the mission.  The north rim of Steno is Geology Station 1 of the mission.

To the south of Steno is Emory, to the northwest are Trident and Powell, and to the northeast is Sherlock.

The crater was named by the astronauts after Danish scientist Nicolas Steno.

Gallery

References

External links

43D1S2(25) Apollo 17 Traverses at Lunar and Planetary Institute
Geological Investigation of the Taurus-Littrow Valley: Apollo 17 Landing Site

Impact craters on the Moon
Apollo 17